Bryocamptus is a genus of copepods belonging to the family Canthocamptidae.

The genus was first described by Chappuis in 1929.

The species of this genus are found in Eurasia and Northern America.

Species:
 Bryocamptus arcticus
 Bryocamptus minutus
 Bryocamptus pygmaeus
 Bryocamptus vejdovskyi

References

Harpacticoida
Copepod genera